The Fiat A.82 was an air cooled radial engine with 18 cylinders developed by the Italian engineering company Fiat and produced in small numbers during World War II. It was one of the most powerful aircraft engines produced in Italy and the culmination of series of successively larger engines developed from the A.74. It was used as the power plant for one operational aircraft, the Fiat BR.20bis bomber.

Design and development
First run in 1938, the A.82 was a more powerful development of the A.80, itself derived from the A.74, which powered the Breda Ba.65 and Fiat BR.20. It was claimed to be 50% more powerful than its antecedents and one of the most powerful engines produced by the country. It was the largest Italian engine design of the time.

The A.82 was an 18 cylinder radial, consisting of two rows of nine cylinders arranged in a double star with a triple throw crankcase made of aluminium alloy. They had steel barrels and aluminium alloy heads. Fuel was mixed in a Zenith-Stromberg downdraught carburettor.

In addition to the fifteen Fiat BR.20bis operated by the Regia Aeronautica, Fiat also used the engine to power design studies like their BR.26 torpedo bomber.

Variants
 A.82 R.C.40  With reduction gear and supercharger, rated altitude .
 A.82 R.C.42  With reduction gear and supercharger, rated altitude .

Applications
 Fiat BR.20bis (R.C.42)

Specifications (R.C.42)
{{pistonspecs|

|ref=Wilkinson, 1945.
|url=https://archive.org/details/in.ernet.dli.2015.205335/page/n293|date=5 June 2019
|type= 18-cylinder, two row, air cooled radial engine
|bore= 
|stroke= 
|displacement= 
|length= 
|diameter= 
|width= 
|height= 
|weight= 
|valvetrain= Two valves per cylinder driven by pushrods
|supercharger= Single stage, mechanical, 8.65:1
|turbocharger=
|fuelsystem=
|fueltype= Gasoline
|oilsystem=
|coolingsystem= Air-cooled
|power={{unordered list
 |Take-off:  at 2400 rpm 
 |Normal:  at 2300 rpm at 
 |Cruise:  at 1900 rpm at 
}}
|specpower=
|compression= 6.5:1
|fuelcon= 0.48 lb/hp/hr (220 g/kW/hr)
|specfuelcon= 
|oilcon= 0.022 lb/hp/hr (10 g/kW/hr)
|power/weight=

|designer=
|reduction_gear=

|general_other= Garelli compressed air starter
|components_other=
|performance_other=
}}

See also

References

Citations

Bibliography
 
 
 
 
 
 

1940s aircraft piston engines
Air-cooled aircraft piston engines
A.82